Hg Capital Trust is a large British investment trust dedicated to investments in unquoted investments. Established in 1989, the company is a constituent of the FTSE 250 Index. The chairman is Jim Strang.

References

External links
  Official site

Investment trusts of the United Kingdom
Financial services companies established in 1989
Companies listed on the London Stock Exchange